Hain may refer to:

 Hain (river), a Belgian tributary of the Scheldt
 Hain, Thuringia, a municipality in Thuringia, Germany
 Hain, Ghana, a community in Upper West Region, Ghana
 Hain Celestial Group, a natural foods company
 Repertorium bibliographicum, a reference book compiled by Ludwig Hain, commonly abbreviated as "Hain"

People with the surname 
 Adelaine Hain (1927–2019), South African anti-apartheid activist
 Ludwig Hain (1781–1836), German bibliographer
 Frank K. Hain (1836–1896), America railroad executive
 Edward Hain (1851–1917), English shipping magnate and politician
 Guy Hain (born 1942), French art forger
 Peter Hain (born 1950), British politician
 Uwe Hain (born 1955), German former footballer
 Kit Hain (born 1956), English musician
 Jeanette Hain (born 1969), German film actress
 Scott Hain (1970–2003), American murderer
 Mathias Hain (born 1972), German former footballer
 Stephan Hain (born 1988), German footballer
 Sam Hain (born 1995), English cricketer

See also
 Hein, a given name
 Hayn (disambiguation)